Kim Jae-ho (born 1963) is a South Korean judge who is the husband of Na Kyung-won, a conservative politician. He graduated from Seoul National University.

Prosecution Dispute
Kim was involved in unjustifiably indicting a blogger who criticized his wife, Na Kyung-won. Na Kyung-won had initially denied any allegation.

References

Seoul National University alumni
Lee Myung-bak Government
Living people
1963 births